Kırka  is a town in Seyitgazi district of Eskişehir Province, Turkey.

Geography 
The population of Kırka was 3941 as of 2012.

History 
There are Phrygian  ruins around Kırka.  But Kırka was founded in 1634 during Ottoman Empire era. Inıtially it was a temporary settlement of Turkmen nomads in the pasture.  But some of these nomads decided to settle. According to tradition the founders of Kırka were forty lords, hence it was named Kırka ("forty lords" in Turkish is kırk ağa). Kırka flourished as a market center of the area. In 1972 it was declared as a seat of township.

Economy 
The major town revenue is mining industry. After Boron products factory was opened in 1984,  boron began to play a major role in town economy. Agriculture and cattle rising are among the other economic activities.

References

Populated places in Eskişehir Province
Towns in Turkey
Seyitgazi District